Szirmabesenyő is a village in Borsod-Abaúj-Zemplén county, Hungary.

Gallery

References

External links

  in Hungarian
 Street map 
 Aerial photographs

Populated places in Borsod-Abaúj-Zemplén County